Kewtaveer (Kewatabir) is a village situated on the banks of the river Ganges in the Indian state of Uttar Pradesh in India.

Geography
It has an average elevation of 84 metres (275 feet).
It is around 40 km. away from Varanasi Cantt.

References

Villages in Mirzapur district